Enterolobium contortisiliquum, commonly known as the pacara earpod tree, is a species of flowering tree in the family Fabaceae.

External links

USDA plant profile

contortisiliquum